Patella pellucida, common name the blue-rayed limpet, is a species of small saltwater limpet, a  marine gastropod mollusc in the family Patellidae, the true limpets.

Range of distribution
This limpet occurs off the eastern Atlantic coasts from Iceland and Norway, to Portugal. It is absent from the Baltic Sea, East Denmark, Belgium and the Netherlands.

Shell description
Up to 15 mm long when fully grown, this species is easily identified by its translucent amber shell with brilliant blue spots running in lines across the top of the shell.

Habitat
The blue-rayed limpet lives primarily on Laminaria (kelp) in strong flowing water but also on Fucus serratus on the lower shore, down to about 30 m.

Life habits
The larvae of this limpet species settle and metamorphose on the algal frond. Here it feeds on its host’s tissue using its radula, leaving small depressions in the frond.

As the limpets grow larger, they move down the stipe of the seaweed towards the holdfast, where they establish themselves by excavating a depression. This can weaken the holdfast, eventually resulting in the seaweed being dislodged by storms. The seaweed is often washed ashore, with the blue-rayed limpets still in place.

References

  Linnaeus, C. (1758). Systema Naturae per regna tria naturae, secundum classes, ordines, genera, species, cum characteribus, differentiis, synonymis, locis. Editio decima, reformata. Laurentius Salvius: Holmiae. ii, 824 pp

External links
 General biology of Blue-Rayed Limpets
  Serge GOFAS, Ángel A. LUQUE, Joan Daniel OLIVER,José TEMPLADO & Alberto SERRA (2021) - The Mollusca of Galicia Bank (NE Atlantic Ocean); European Journal of Taxonomy 785: 1–114
 

Patellidae
Gastropods described in 1758
Taxa named by Carl Linnaeus